The Sixteenth Amendment of the Constitution Act 1996 (previously bill no. 49 of 1996) is an amendment of the Constitution of Ireland which provides that a court can refuse bail to a suspect where it feared that while at liberty they would commit a serious criminal offence. It was approved by referendum on 28 November 1996 and signed into law on 12 December of the same year.

Background
In People (AG) v O'Callaghan (1966), the Supreme Court had ruled that the provisions of Article 40.4, which guarantees personal liberty and the principle of habeas corpus, meant that an individual charged with a crime could only be refused bail if they were likely to flee or to interfere with witnesses or evidence. In a 1976 Dáil debate on "the breakdown in law and order", Paddy Cooney, the Minister for Justice in the Fine Gael–Labour coalition, said the government favoured a referendum on reducing the right to bail.

A Law Reform Commission report published in August 1995 and chaired by former Supreme Court judge Anthony Hederman considered legal approaches to bail. The Sixteenth Amendment made it possible for a court to take into account whether or not a person had committed serious crimes while on bail in the past. The amendment was introduced by the Fine Gael–Labour Party–Democratic Left government led by Taoiseach John Bruton.

Changes to the text
Insertion of new Article 40.4.7º:

Note: This provision was renumbered as 40.4.6º by the Twenty-first Amendment of the Constitution of Ireland in 2002.

Oireachtas debate
A similar proposal had been proposed by Fianna Fáil Justice Spokesperson John O'Donoghue on 8 June 1995. On 4 October 1995, this was rejected by 65 votes to 47.

On 16 October 1996, Minister for Justice Nora Owen proposed the Sixteenth Amendment of the Constitution Bill 1996. It was supported by the two major opposition parties, Fianna Fáil and the Progressive Democrats, and passed final stages in the Dáil on the same day. It passed final stages in the Seanad on 23 October and proceeded to a referendum on 28 November 1996.

Result

Aftermath
The Bail Act 1997 was passed as the provision to be made by law arising from the amendment.

References

External links
Sixteenth Amendment of the Constitution Act 1996
Bail Act 1997
Oireachtas Debates on the Sixteenth Amendment of the Constitution Bill 1996
Oireachtas Debates on the Fifteenth Amendment of the Constitution Bill 1995
Full text of the Constitution of Ireland

1996 in Irish law
1996 in Irish politics
1996 referendums
16
Bail
16
November 1996 events in Europe
Amendment, 16